Conus boui is a species of sea snail, a marine gastropod mollusk in the family Conidae, the cone snails, cone shells or cones.

These snails are predatory and venomous. They are capable of "stinging" humans.

Description
The size of the shell varies between 30 mm and 50 mm.

Distribution
This marine species occurs in the Mid-Atlantic Ridge and off Martinique

References

 Tucker J.K. (2010) Danker L. N. Vink's The Conidae of the Western Atlantic. The Cone Collector 14A: 1-166
 Puillandre N., Duda T.F., Meyer C., Olivera B.M. & Bouchet P. (2015). One, four or 100 genera? A new classification of the cone snails. Journal of Molluscan Studies. 81: 1-23

External links
 To World Register of Marine Species
 Cone Shells - Knights of the Sea
 Dauciconus boui

boui
Gastropods described in 1988